Peace and National Unity Party of Afghanistan is a political party in Afghanistan. The party was founder by a former Islamic Party of Afghanistan commander from Ghor, Abdulqader Emami Ghori.

Ghori was however removed from his post as party leader in 2005, and replaced by Dr. Nisar Ahmad Ahmadzai.

References

Political parties in Afghanistan